Saw Bwe Hmu (19 October 1952–24 July 1994) was a co-founder and the band leader of the Burmese band Iron Cross and a well known songwriter. The ethnic Karen Christian was the lead guitarist of the band. Other band members included Chit San Maung (guitar), Khin Maung Thant (bass), Banya Naing (keyboards) and Kha Yan (drums). Lay Phyu, Ah Nge, Myo Gyi and Wyne Wyne were the key singers of that band and R Zarni soon joined the band later. Composers Maung Maung Zaw Latt and L Phyu freed it from its reliance on such popular American bands as Metallica and won it critical acclaim and a wide public. He played the guitar at Success and Symphony music bands before Iron Cross was founded. He composed songs for Kaiser. He was a music critic and his pen name was Zar Hlaing.

He died at the age of 39 on 24 July 1994. He was survived by wife and ex-keyboard player Naw Phaw War and 2 daughters, Mi Mi Khe and Kabya Bwe Hmu. Both the two daughters are successful singers.

References

1994 deaths
Burmese musicians
1952 births
People from Sittwe
Burmese Christians
Burmese people of Karen descent